BaneService is a Norwegian government owned railway construction and maintenance company. It is by far the largest subcontractor for Bane NOR and is owned by the Norwegian Ministry of Transport and Communications.

History
The company started out as a division of Norges Statsbaner (NSB), with the construction and maintenance functions dating back to the formation of NSB in 1883. The division was separated from the planning department in 1992 and became part of Jernbaneverket when NSB was split up in 1996 with the name Jernbaneverket BaneService.

On 1 January 2005 the company became a separate limited company after the liberal-conservative government wanted to create a market for public tender bids for the maintenance of the railway infrastructure. To do this BaneService had to be separated from Jernbaneverket, much like the separation of Statens Vegvesen and Mesta. The red-green government to follow in 2005 has announced that they will revert the decision to privatise the maintenance of the railway, but BaneService has remained a separate company.

References

Railway companies of Norway
Construction and civil engineering companies of Norway
Government-owned companies of Norway
Railway companies established in 2005
Norwegian companies established in 2005
Construction and civil engineering companies established in 2005
Norwegian National Rail Administration
Ministry of Transport (Norway)